Ioannis Mitakis (born 8 November 1989, Marousi) is a Greek sailor. He competed at the 2012 Summer Olympics and at the 2016 Summer Olympics in the Men's Finn class. He finished in 14th place at the 2012 Summer Olympics, and in 11th at the 2016 Summer Olympics.

References

External links
 
 
 

1989 births
Living people
Greek male sailors (sport)
Olympic sailors of Greece
Sailors at the 2012 Summer Olympics – Finn
Sailors at the 2016 Summer Olympics – Finn
Sailors at the 2020 Summer Olympics – Finn
Sailors (sport) from Athens